The Leinster Junior Challenge Cup was the forerunner of the Leinster Towns Cup.

It was established as a competition for clubs below senior level who were affiliated to the Leinster branch of the Irish Rugby Football Union. The first competition was played during the 1888-1889 season.

The conditions of the competition were changed for 1926 competition and only teams who were located at least 18 miles from the General Post Office in O'Connell Street were eligible to compete.

Past winners

 1889 Blackrock College P & P
 1890 Santry
 1891 Ranelagh School
 1892 Blackrock College P & P
 1893 Blackrock College P & P
 1894 Old Wesley
 1895 Old Wesley
 1896 General Post Office F.C.
 1897 General Post Office F.C.
 1898 Blackrock College P & P
 1899 Blackrock College P & P
 1900 Clontarf
 1901 Santry RFC
 1902 R.I.C. RFC
 1903 R.I.C. RFC
 1904 Co Carlow
 1905 St Mary's College RFC
 1906 R.I.C. RFC
 1907 St Mary's College RFC
 1908 St Mary's College RFC
 1909 Dundalk
 1910 Merrion
 1911 St Mary's College RFC
 1912 Co Carlow
 1913 Co Carlow
 1914 University College Dublin RFC
 1915
 1916
 1917
 1918
 1919 Co Carlow
 1920 Kilkenny
 1921 Railway Union
 1922 Co Carlow
 1923 Enniscorthy
 1924 County Kildare (Naas)
 1925 Enniscorthy RFC beat Naas 10-3

See also

 Leinster Rugby
 Rugby union in Ireland
 Leinster Towns Cup

Rugby union competitions in Leinster
1888 establishments in Ireland